The Dr. James A. Ross House is a historic house in Pikeville, Tennessee, U.S.. It was built circa 1872 for Dr. James A. Ross, his wife Jennie Brown and their children. Ross was a physician who served in the Confederate States Army during the American Civil War of 1861–1865; in the postbellum era, he became a real estate investor. The house was purchased by Bledsoe County in 1997.

The house was designed in the Folk Victorian style, a combination of Queen Anne and Italianate architectural styles. It has been listed on the National Register of Historic Places since June 25, 1999.

References

Houses on the National Register of Historic Places in Tennessee
Italianate architecture in Tennessee
Houses completed in 1872
National Register of Historic Places in Bledsoe County, Tennessee